The 2014 Egypt Cup is the eighty-second season of the Egypt Cup since its establishment in 1921. A total of 48 teams are contesting for the Cup, The draw was held on 12 May 2014.

preliminary round

Round of 32

Round of 16

Quarterfinals

Semifinals

Final

Top scorers

References

External links 
 http://www.filgoal.com/Arabic/News.aspx?NewsID=136770

1
Egypt Cup
2013–14 in Egyptian football